No One Rides for Free is Southern Californian stoner rock band Fu Manchu's debut album. This is the only record with Mark Abshire on bass guitar; he was replaced by Brad Davis. Mark Abshire later teamed up with Eddie Glass and Ruben Romano to form the power trio Nebula. This album is produced by later Fu Manchu and then Kyuss drummer Brant Bjork. A 20-year anniversary edition was released in 2014.

Critical reaction
Drowned in Sound reckoned it inferior to Daredevil, but still authentic stoner rock. Debaser also gave the reissue a positive review.  The Rough Guide to Rock called it a "classic".

Track listing

Personnel 
Scott Hill – guitar, vocals, producer
Ruben Romano – drums, producer
Mark Abshire – bass, producer
Eddie Glass – guitar, producer
Brant Bjork – producer

Credits 
Recorded and mixed at Sandbox Studio
Engineered and mixed by Geoff Siegel
Mastered by Stephan Marcussen
All songs by Fu Manchu
Published by Van-O-Rama Music/ASCAP 1993
Cover photo: Von Lidd
Live photos: Alex Obleas
Management: Guerrilla MGMT./Catherine Enny

References

1994 debut albums
Fu Manchu (band) albums